Bragança Paulista is a municipality in the state of São Paulo in Brazil. The population is 170,533 (2020 est.) in an area of 512.6 km². The elevation is 817 m.

The city is famous for its traditional sausages, with several establishments claiming to sell the "real Bragança sausage". Bragança has become a commuter town due to its proximity to São Paulo and Campinas. As a result, real estate is developing at a fast pace and several gated communities have sprung up all over town.

The city is served by Arthur Siqueira Airport dedicated to general aviation.

History
The city was founded in December 15, 1763 as a settlement next to a small chapel and was originally called Conceição do Jaguari. The founders were Antonio Pires Pimentel and his wife, Ignácia da Silva Pimentel. By February 1765, the settlement was officially recognized and renamed as Distrito de Paz e Freguesia de Conceição do Jaguari. In October of 1767, the location was elevated to the condition of village and renamed as Village of New Bragança (Nova Bragança, after Bragança, Portugal). By 1856, the village of Nova Bragança was broken off from the township of Atibaia, becoming the town of Bragança.

Sports 
In sports, the most notable football (soccer) team in the city is Bragantino, which plays at Estádio Nabi Abi Chedid, and was the 1990 Campeonato Paulista champion and 1991 Campeonato Brasileiro Série A runner-up.

The area also has a purportedly good golf course and residential community. Quinta da Baroneza golf course is set within one of the most luxurious condominiums in São Paulo’s surroundings. Inspired by the Scottish links style, Quinta da Baroneza is another masterpiece of US architect Dan Blankenship.

Attractions 
One of the town's main attractions is Taboão Lake (Lago do Taboão), which houses a number of bars and restaurants. The lakeside is crowded on weekends with many people both inside and outside the bars. Places to visit include Triarito (formerly Trairagem, a bar beside the lake serving food and snacks), Lago Bier (a bit more upmarket, with an à la carte menu), Porkarias (with Brazilian country music and dancing) and the pubs in the countryside, like Busca Vida and Santa Luzia which are known for alternative music bands.

Geography

Weather 
Bragança Paulista has a subtropical climate with hot summers and dry winters.

References

External links
 Official home page (in Portuguese).
 São Francisco University (in Portuguese).
 Information about Bragança (in Portuguese).
 Satellite photo of Bragança. Google Maps.
 Bragança Airport(airclub) (in Portuguese).